Jeppe Schøler Svenningsen (born 14 October 1994) is a Danish professional footballer who plays as a right back or centre back for Thisted FC.

References

Danish men's footballers
Danish Superliga players
1994 births
Living people
AC Horsens players
Thisted FC players
Vendsyssel FF players
Association football defenders
Danish 1st Division players
Danish 2nd Division players